Elie Track is a physicist, applied scientist, businessman, and entrepreneur. He currently resides in Stamford, Connecticut. He was named a Fellow of the Institute of Electrical and Electronics Engineers (IEEE) in 2014 for his leadership and work in superconducting electronics and its applications.

He obtained a PhD degree from Yale University in 1988 after studying with Professor Daniel Prober.

References

External links

20th-century births
Living people
American physicists
American businesspeople
Fellow Members of the IEEE
Year of birth missing (living people)
Place of birth missing (living people)